A tic is a sudden, repetitive, nonrhythmic movement or sound.

Tic or TIC may also refer to:

Businesses and organizations
 Technology Innovation Centre, at Birmingham City University
 Telecommunication Infrastructure Company of I.R.Iran
 Tyne Improvement Commission of Tyne and Wear, England

People
 Tic Forrester (1896–1970), a U.S. Representative from Georgia
 Tic Price (b. 1955), a college basketball coach
 Tic (musician), Ghanaian musician

Science, technology, and mathematics
 Thermal imaging camera
 Titanium carbide, chemical formula TiC
 Total inorganic carbon, a composition characteristic of liquid and solid material samples
 Total ion current, a type of mass chromatogram
 Trauma-induced coagulopathy
 Trusted Internet Connection
 Truncated cube, a polyhedron
 TESS Input Catalog, a star catalog

Other uses
 Tenancy in common, in property law, a form of concurrent estate
 Treasury International Capital, a set of US Treasury reports
 Jockey Club Ti-I College, a secondary school in Hong Kong
 Tinak Airport, Marshall Islands (by IATA code)
 Tongue-in-cheek abbreviation

See also
 Tick (disambiguation)
 Tik (disambiguation)